Kenneth Don Gray (March 10, 1936 – November 25, 2017) was an offensive guard who played 13 seasons in the National Football League for the Chicago/St. Louis Cardinals and the Houston Oilers. Born in San Saba, Texas, Gray attended and played football for four seasons at Howard Payne University. 

The Green Bay Packers selected Gray in the sixth round of the 1958 NFL Draft (62nd pick overall) and he was the final player cut by Packer coach Scooter McLean in training camp prior to the regular NFL season that year. Other NFL teams contacted Gray to try out and he settled on the Chicago Cardinals because he would be driving through Illinois from Green Bay to Texas.  His first NFL contract, in 1958, paid him $6,000. After retiring as a player - earning All-Pro notice seven consecutive seasons (1963-'69) and six Pro Bowls - he served for three years as head coach at his high school alma mater, Llano High and offensive line coach for the Denver Broncos and reached Super Bowl XII, where they lost against the Dallas Cowboys. In 2016, he was inducted into the Texas Sports Hall of Fame along with former University of Texas head football coach Fred Akers, former Dallas Cowboys offensive lineman Larry Allen and former Major League Baseball pitcher Andy Pettitte. He earned a spot on the St. Louis Cardinals’ All-Time Team and the NFL All-1960s Team. 

Ken met his longtime wife, Shirley, in high school and married soon after.

Gray died in Llano, Texas where he lived on November 25, 2017, at the age of 81. In 2018, the Professional Football Researchers Association named Gray to the PFRA Hall of Very Good Class of 2018

References

1936 births
2017 deaths
People from San Saba, Texas
People from Llano, Texas
American Christians
Christians from Texas
Players of American football from Texas
American football offensive linemen
Howard Payne Yellow Jackets football players
Chicago Cardinals players
St. Louis Cardinals (football) players
Houston Oilers players
Eastern Conference Pro Bowl players
Coaches of American football from Texas
Denver Broncos coaches